Werner Kniesek (born November 17, 1946 in Salzburg) is an Austrian triple murderer, who was one of the most dangerous offenders in Austria's criminal history, torturing and killing a family of three while on parole.

First crimes 
Born illegitimately and raised in Salzburg, Kniesek began skipping school, stealing and running away from home as a youth. He had never met his father and his mother was overwhelmed with him, so she wanted him to find himself a house. When he learned this, Werner stabbed her with a knife, stole some money and fled to Germany, where the 16-year-old was arrested in Hamburg and extradited back to Austria. After two years of juvenile detention for attempted murder, Kniesek was released. After committing several burglaries, he shot a 73-year-old woman. In 1973, he pleaded insanity and was sentenced to eight-and-a-half years in prison, where he was dismissed in early January 1980 for good behaviour. A few weeks before his release, he was given a three-day prison leave from the Garsten Prison to seek work. He had been convicted seven times since the age of 16, had been in prison for 15 years, and spent 13 months in a workhouse.

St. Pölten murders 
With the money that Kniesek received in jail through making illegal liquor, he bought a gas pistol in Vienna and on January 16, 1980 went by train to St. Pölten, where he posed as a carpet representative, and took a taxi to the Am Kupferbrunnberg settlement. Arbitrarily, he broke into the villa of the Altreiter family in the Fuchsenkellergasse, where 26-year-old wheelchair user Walter was living. He held Walter down, and when his 55-year-old mother Gertrude and 24-year-old sister Ingrid came home in the evening, they were overwhelmed and tied by Kniesek in the hallway. Since the mother believed this was a robbery, she presented the offender with a check for 20,000 schillings.

Shortly thereafter, Kniesek tortured and strangled the son with his bare hands, dragging the body from the wheelchair to his mother, torturing her as well, and then strangling her three hours later with a noose. Ingrid was mistreated by Kniesek for seven to eleven hours and then strangled as well. Her body was covered with welts, hematomas, and dozens of burn marks. Before she died, she had responded to a call from her fiancé, saying that she was in a hurry, had no time, and had to cancel an upcoming meeting. Kniesek is said to have been in the vicinity. He also killed the family's cat, laid down and fell asleep next to his victims. A 21-year-old lodger survived because she had exchanged her day off with a colleague and therefore was not at home.

Capture and condemnation 
The next morning Kniesek packed the three bodies in the trunk of the family's Mercedes-Benz and undertook a shopping spree with the redeemed check. In Karlstetten, Kniesek visited a restaurant and some people became suspicious when they noticed the large amounts of cash of the taciturn man, who also wore black gloves, which he did not take off for the whole meal. He also inquired about the next motorway ramp.

An employee noted down the Mercedes' license plate and alerted the gendarmerie, who then drove to the Altreiters' estate and discovered a broken window. Since the three residents were also missing, a nationwide search for the car and the family was initiated. Shortly before midnight, a radio patrol car found the car at the Salzburg Südtiroler Platz and was able to arrest Kniesek and return him to the vehicle. While searching the vehicle, authorities discovered the three bodies in the car's trunk.

After two days, Kniesek finally confessed to having murdered the Altreiter family out of sheer desire to kill. The murders served only his mental satisfaction and he could not point out any other murders. He even forced Gertrude Altreiter to take her heart medicine, so that she would not lose consciousness and experience the agony better. According to investigators, the Altreiter family became Kniesek's victims purely accidentally. Kniesek had shown up at the house of a building contractor and his family, with the pretext of finding out the address of a doctor. Their dog however had deterred him, according to the St. Pölten police commander. In a cell of the Salzburg provincial court Kniesek tried to kill himself, but was prevented by court officials.

On July 4, 1980, Werner Kniesek was sentenced by the St. Pölten district court to life imprisonment and admitted to an institution for the mentally unstable. In 1983, he made an escape attempt from the Stein Prison, but he failed.

Impact on the prison system 
At a press conference, Minister of Justice Christian Broda commented on the case of Werner Kniesek, stressing the importance of scientific and medical advice in prison, and that if Kniesek had been convicted after January 1, 1975, this crime would not have happened. At that point in time, the concept of insanity had been extended so that perpetrators like Kniesek could be accommodated to mental hospitals, even beyond the expiration of their judiciously received punishment. Since there are no retroactive laws in Austria under the rule of law, dangerous prisoners such as Kniesek could not be included in the enforcement of measures retrospectively.

Therefore, a nine-member working group was formed, which would capture prisoners who were sentenced under the existing penal code until 1975, the new penal code but could fall into the group of mentally abnormal lawbreakers and potential recidivists. Although these could not subsequently be transferred to the enforcement, they would serve their remainder in a special institution.

Film 
The film Angst by Gerald Kargl is based on Werner Kniesek's crimes.

Literature 

 Andreas Zeppetzauer, Regina Zeppetzauer: Murder. The most spectacular murders in Austria. Stocker publishing house, Graz 2005, . 
 Alexandra Wehner: Traces of Evil. Ueberreuter, Vienna 2007, .

References 

1946 births
Austrian murderers
Family murders
Living people